Marcel Rocque (born June 22, 1971 in St. Paul, Alberta) is a Canadian curler from Edmonton, Alberta. He is a four-time winner of The Brier, the annual Canadian men's curling championship and a three-time World Champion as the lead for the Randy Ferbey team. Rocque would play in two Alberta provincial championships as a lead for Don Walchuk before joining the Ferbey team by 1999. 

In 2019, Rocque finished second in a TSN poll of broadcasters, reporters and top curlers to name the greatest Canadian male lead in curling history.

Coaching
Marcel Rocque began coaching the Chinese women's team in 2013 and was the coach for the China's Men Curling team for the 2014 Winter Olympics held in Sochi, Russia. He helped the team reach the fourth position in final rankings. He was also the coach for China Mixed Doubles at the 2018 Winter Olympics. Starting in the 2018-19 curling season, he became the coach for Team Homan.

Personal life
Rocque is a third cousin to curler Kelsey Rocque. His wife Raylene is also a curler, and until the end of the 2009/2010 Season played with Cathy King's team. Cathy and Raylene have now retired from the game. He has two daughters and is employed as a culinary teacher.

References

External links
 

1971 births
Living people
Brier champions
Canadian educators
People from the County of St. Paul No. 19
Curlers from Edmonton
World curling champions
Canadian male curlers
Continental Cup of Curling participants
Canadian curling coaches
Canada Cup (curling) participants